Qutb-ud-Din Bahadur Shah, born Bahadur Khan was a sultan of the Muzaffarid dynasty who reigned over the Gujarat Sultanate, a late medieval kingdom in India from 1526 to 1535 and again from 1536 to 1537. He ascended to throne after competing with his brothers. He expanded his kingdom and made expeditions to help neighbouring kingdoms. In 1532, Gujarat came under attack of the Mughal Emperor Humayun and fell. Bahadur Shah regained the kingdom in 1536 but he was killed by the Portuguese on board a ship when making a deal with them.

The army of Bahadur Shah included the Koli tribe and Abyssinians. The Kolis of Gujarat attacked the Humayun in the help of Bahadur Shah at the Gulf of Khambhat.

Early years
Bahadur Shah's father was Shams-ud-Din Muzaffar Shah II, who had ascended to the throne of the Gujarat Sultanate in 1511. Muzaffar Shah II nominated Sikandar Shah (Bahadur Shah's elder brother) as the heir apparent to the throne. Bahadur Khan's relationship with his brother and father became tense as Sikandar Shah began to assume greater administrative control. Fearing for his life, Bahadur Khan fled Gujarat, first seeking refuge with Chittor, and then with Ibrahim Lodi. He was present at the Battle of Panipat, though he did not take part in fighting.

After death of Muzaffar Shah II in 1526, Sikandar Sháh succeeded. After few weeks in power, he was murdered on the instructions of his slave Imád-ul-Mulk Khush Kadam, who seated an infant brother of Sikandar's, named Násir Khán, on the throne with the title of Mahmud Shah II and governed on his behalf. Three other princes were poisoned. The only event of Sikandar's reign was the destruction of an army sent against his brother Latíf Khán who was helped by Rána Bhím of Munga (now Chhota Udaipur). When Bahadur Khan received the news of the death of his father, he returned to Gujarat. The nobles deserted Imád-ul-Mulk's cause, and prince Báhádur Khán, was joined by many supporters prominent among whom was Táj Khán, proprietor of Dhandhuka. Bahádur marched at once on Chámpáner, captured and executed Imád-ul-Mulk and poisoning Násir Khán ascended the throne in 1527 with the title of Bahádur Sháh.

His brother Latíf Khán, aided by Rája Bhím of the Kohistan or hill land of Pál (Pal-Dadhvav, near Bhuloda, Gujarat), now asserted his claim to the throne. He was defeated, and fell wounded into the hands of the Gujarát army and died of his wounds and was buried at Halol. Rája Bhím was slain. As Bhím's successor Ráisingh plundered Dahod, a large force was sent against him, commanded by Táj Khán, who laid waste Ráisingh's country and dismantled his forts. Only one of his brother, Chand Khan survived, as he had refuge at the Malwa court and the Sultan Mahmud Shah II of Malwa refused to surrender him.

Reign

During his reign, Gujarat was under pressure from the expanding Mughal Empire under emperors Babur (died 1530) and Humayun (1530–1540), and from the Portuguese, who were establishing fortified settlements on the Gujarat coast to expand their power in India from their base in Goa.

Expansion of Sultanate
Soon after Bahádur Sháh visited Cambay, and found that Malik Is-hák the governor of Sorath and son of Malik Ayyaz, had, in the interests of the Portuguese, attempted to seize Diu but had been repulsed by the Gujarát admiral Mahmúd Áka. The Sultán entrusted Diu to Kiwám-ul-Mulk and Junágaḍh to Mujáhid Khán Bhíkan and returned to Áhmedábád. In 1527 he enforced tribute from Ídar and the neighbouring country. During one of his numerous expeditions he went to hunt in Nándod and received the homage of the Rája.

As the Portuguese were endeavouring to establish themselves on the coast of Sorath, and, if possible, to obtain Diu, the king was constantly at Cambay (now Khambhat), Diu and Ghogha to frustrate their attempts, and he now directed the construction of the fortress of Bharuch. At this time Muhammad Khán, ruler of Asír and Burhánpur (both of Khandesh), requested Bahádur's aid on behalf of Imád-ul-Mulk, ruler of Berar. Bahádur Sháh started at once and at Nandurbár was joined by Muhammad Khán Asíri, and thence proceeded to Burhánpur, where he was met by Imád Sháh from Gávalgad. After certain successes he made peace between Burhan Nizam Shah I and Imád Sháh Gávali, and returned to Gujarát.

Jám Fírúz the ruler of Thatta in Sindh now sought refuge with Bahádur Sháh from the oppression either of the Ghoris or of the Mughals and was hospitably received. In 1528 Bahádur made an expedition into the Deccan which ended in a battle at Daulatabad. Later he was forced to retire because of the stiff resistance put up by the Ahmadnagar army. Next year (1529) at the request of Jaâfar or Khizr Khán, son of Imád Sháh Gávali, who was sent to Gujarát to solicit Bahádur's help, he again marched for the Deccan. As he passed through Muler Biharji the Rája of Báglán gave him his daughter in marriage and in return received the title of Bahr Khán. From Báglán Bahr Khán was told off to ravage Chaul which by this time had fallen into the hands of the Portuguese. Bahádur himself advanced to Ahmednagar, took the fort and destroyed many of the buildings. Purandhar also was sacked of its stores of gold. From Ahmednagar, Bahádur Sháh passed to Burhánpur, and there his general Kaisar Khán gained a victory over the united forces of Nizám Sháh, Malik Beríd, and Ain-ul-Mulk. Finally, both the rulers of the Ahmadnagar and Berar were forced to sign a humiliating treaty. Bahádur returned to Gujarát and for some time refrained from interfering in the affairs of the Deccan.

Between 1526 and 1530, certain Turks under one Mústafa came to Gujarát, traders according to one account according to another part of a Turkish fleet expected to act against the Portuguese. Diu was assigned them as a place of residence and the command of the island was granted to Malik Túghán, son of Malik Ayyáz, the former governor.

Bahadur Shah had sent a delegation headed by ‘Abd al-‘Aziz Asaf Khan to Ottoman Empire in 1530s.

In 1530 the king marched to Nágor, and gave an audience both to Prithviraj of Dungarpur and to the ambassadors from Rána Ratansi of Chittor. The Rána's ambassadors complained of encroachments on Chittor by Mahmúd Shah II of Malwa Sultanate. Mahmúd promised to appear before Bahádur to explain the alleged encroachments. Bahádur waited. At last as Mahmúd failed to attend Bahádur said he would go and meet Mahmúd. He invested Mándu and received with favour certain deserters from Mahmúd's army. The fortress fell and Sultán Mahmúd and his seven sons were captured without any resistance on March 28, 1531 Mandu. Malwa was annexed into his kingdom.

After passing the rainy season at Mándu, Bahádur Sháh went to Burhánpur to visit his nephew Mirán Muhammad Sháh. At Burhánpur, Bahádur under the influence of the great priest-statesman Sháh Táhir, was reconciled with Burhán Nizám Shah I gave him the royal canopy he had taken from Málwa. Bahádur offered Sháh Táhir the post of minister. Sháh Táhir declined saying he must make a pilgrimage to Mecca. He retired to Ahmednagar and there converted Burhán Nizám Sháh to the Shia Islam.

In the same year, hearing that Mánsingji, Rája of Halvad, had killed the commandant of Dasada, Bahádur despatched Khán Khánán against him. Viramgam and Mándal were taken over from the Jhála chieftains, and ever after formed part of the crown dominions.

When Malwa's Sultán Mahmúd II and his sons were being conveyed to the fortress of Champaner, Ráisingh, Rája of Pál, endeavoured to rescue them. The attempt failed, and the prisoners were put to death by their guards. In 1531, on Bahádur's return from Burhánpur to Dhár, hearing that Silhadi, the chief of Raisen in east Málwa kept in captivity certain women who had belonged to the harem of Sultán Násir-ud-dín of Málwa, Bahádur marched against him and forced him to surrender and embrace Islám. The chief secretly sent to the Rána of Chitor for aid and delayed handing over Raisen. On learning this Bahádur dispatched a force to keep Chitor in check and pressed the siege. At his own request, Silhadi was sent to persuade the garrison to surrender. But their reproaches stung him so sharply, that, joining with them, they sallied forth sword in hand and were all slain. Raisen fell into Bahádur's hands, and this district together with those of Bhilsa and Chanderi were entrusted to the government of Sultán Alam Lodhi. The king now went to Gondwana to hunt elephants, and, after capturing many, employed his army in reducing Gagraon and other minor fortresses. In 1532, he advanced against Chittor, but raised the siege on receiving an enormous ransom. Shortly afterwards his troops took the strong fort of Ranthambhore.

About this time on receipt of news that the Portuguese were usurping authority, the Sultán repaired to Diu. Before he arrived the Portuguese had taken to flight, leaving behind them an enormous gun which the Sultán ordered to be dragged to Chámpáner.

Humayun's Conquest of Gujarat

Before 1532 was over, Bahádur Sháh quarrelled with Humayun, the Mughal emperor of Delhi. The original grounds for the quarrel was that Bahádur Sháh had sheltered Sultán Muhammad Zamán Mírza, the grandson of a daughter of the emperor Babar (1482–1530). Humáyún's anger was increased by an insolent answer from Bahadur Shah. Without considering that he had provoked a powerful enemy, Bahádur Sháh again laid siege to Chittor, and though he heard that Humáyún had arrived at Gwalior, he would not desist from the siege. In March 1535 Chittor fell into the hands of the Gujarát king but near Mandasúr (now mandsaur) his army was shortly afterwards routed by Humáyún. According to one account, the failure of the Gujarát army was due to Bahádur and his nobles being spell-bound by looking at a heap of salt and some cloth soaked in indigo which were mysteriously left before Bahádur's tent by an unknown elephant. The usual and probably true explanation is that Rúmi Khán the Turk, head of the Gujarát artillery, betrayed Bahádur's interest. Still though Rúmi Khán's treachery may have had a share in Bahádur's defeat it seems probable that in valour, discipline, and tactics the Gujarát army was inferior to the Mughals. Bahádur Sháh, unaccustomed to defeat, lost heart and fled to Mandu, which fortress was speedily taken by Humáyún. From Mándu the king fled to Chámpáner, and finally took refuge in Diu. Chámpáner fell to Humáyún, and the whole of Gujarát, except Sorath, came under his rule.

At this time Sher Shah Suri revolted, in Bihar and Jaunpur, and Humáyún returned to Agra to oppose him leaving his brother Hindál Mírza in Áhmedábád, Kásam Beg in Bharuch, and Yádgár Násir Mírza in Pátan. As soon as Humáyún departed, the country rose against the Mughals, and his old nobles requested the king to join them. Bahádur joined them, and, defeating the Mughals at Kaníj village near Mahmúdábád (now Mahemdavad), expelled them from Gujarát.

Engagement with the Portuguese and death

While Bahadur was engaged in the siege of Mandu against the Mughals, a strong Portuguese fleet sailed from Bombai (now Mumbai), led by Nuno da Cunha. On February 7, 1531 the fleet neared Shiyal Bet island, which they captured overcoming in spite of strong resistance. On February 16, 1531 they started bombarding Diu but could not succeed to inflict any appreciable damage to its fortification. On March 1, 1531 Nuno da Cunha left for Goa, leaving a subordinate officer, who systematically destroyed Mahuva, Ghogha, Valsad, Mahim, Kelva, Agashi and Surat.

As Gujarat fell to the Mughal Empire, Bahadur Shah was forced to court the Portuguese. On 23 December 1534 while on board the galleon St. Mattheus he signed the Treaty of Bassein. Based on the terms of the agreement, the Portuguese Empire gained control of the city of Bassein (Vasai), as well as its territories, islands, and seas which included Daman and Bombay islands too. He had granted them leave to erect a factory in Diu. Instead of a factory the Portuguese built the Diu Fort.

When he recovered his kingdom, Bahádur, repenting of his alliance with the Portuguese, went to Sorath to persuade an army of Portuguese, whom he had asked to come to his assistance, to return to Goa. In February 1537, when the Portuguese arrived at Diu, five or six thousand strong, the sultan hoping to get rid of them by stratagem, went to Diu and endeavored to get the viceroy into his power. The viceroy excused himself, and in return invited the king to visit his ship anchored off the coast of Gujarat. Bahádur agreed, and on his way back was attacked and killed by the Portuguese; his body was dumped into the Arabian Sea. He was then thirty-one years old and in the eleventh year of his reign. According to the author of the Mirăt-i-Sikandari the reason for Bahádur's murder was that a message from him to the Deccan sultans, inviting them to join him in an alliance against the Portuguese, had fallen into the hands of the viceroy. Whatever may have been the provocation or the intention, both sides had treacherous designs; neither party was able to carry out his original plan. The end was unpremeditated, hurried on by mutual suspicions. These events were followed by the 1538 Siege of Diu which resulted in the permanent occupation of Diu by Portuguese which lasted till 1961.

His Sultanate
Up to the defeat of Sultán Bahádur by Humáyún, the power of Gujarát was at its height. Cadets of noble Rájput houses, Prithiráj, the nephew of Rána Sánga of Chitor, and Narsingh Deva the cousin of the Rája of Gwálior, were proud to enroll themselves as the Sultán's vassals. The Rája of Baglán readily gave Bahádur Sháh his daughter. Jám Fírúz of Thatta in Sindh and the sons of Bahlúl Lodhi were suppliants at his court. Málwa was a dependency of Gujarát and the Nizám Sháhis of Ahmednagar and Nasírkhan of Burhánpur acknowledged him as overlord, while the Fárúkis of Khándesh were dependent on Bahádur's constant help.

He built the mausoleum at Halol in honour of his brothers and predecessors, Sikandar Shah and Mahmud Shah II.

He was a great patron of the Hindustani Classical music and its artists, including Baiju Bawra.

Succession
Bahadur had no son, hence there was some uncertainty regarding succession after his death. Muhammad Zaman Mirza, the fugitive Mughal prince made his claim on the ground that Bahadur's mother adopted him as her son. The nobles selected Bahadur's nephew Miran Muhammad Shah of Khandesh as his successor, but he died on his way to Gujarat. Finally, the nobles selected Mahmud Khan, the son of Bahadur's brother Latif Khan as his successor and he ascended to the throne as Mahmud Shah III on May 10, 1538.

References

1537 deaths
Year of birth unknown
Gujarat sultans
16th-century Indian monarchs